Todd Robert Bowles  (born November 18, 1963) is an American football coach and former player who is the head coach for the Tampa Bay Buccaneers of the National Football League (NFL). He previously served as the head coach of the New York Jets. Bowles has also served as the defensive coordinator of the Arizona Cardinals and Buccaneers and as the secondary coach for the New York Jets, Cleveland Browns, Dallas Cowboys, Miami Dolphins, and Philadelphia Eagles. Bowles played eight seasons in the NFL as a safety, primarily for the Washington Redskins, and started in Super Bowl XXII.

Early years
Bowles attended Elizabeth High School in Elizabeth, New Jersey. He played college football at Temple University (Class of 1985), where he was a four-year starting cornerback for Bruce Arians, for whom Bowles would be an assistant coach decades later when Arians was head coach of the Arizona Cardinals and then the Tampa Bay Buccaneers in the NFL. Bowles recorded seven interceptions in his four college seasons.

Playing career
Bowles was signed by the Washington Redskins as an undrafted free agent on May 7, 1986. He chose the Redskins over six other NFL teams, and signed a contract that included a signing bonus between $8,000 and $10,000. Bowles competed in training camp with free safety Raphel Cherry, and beat him out to earn a spot on the regular season roster. In his second training camp in 1987, Bowles beat out Curtis Jordan for the starting free safety job when Jordan was released during final roster cuts on September 8, 1987. He intercepted a career high four passes and recovered a fumble during the season, and was the starting free safety in Super Bowl XXII, which Washington won in a blowout.

On February 1, 1989, after his contract expired, Bowles was left unprotected by the Redskins during "Plan B" free agency, despite being a regular starter at free safety the previous two seasons.  This was reportedly due to his poor catching abilities in 1988, as well as his lack of playmaking ability.  He negotiated contracts with the Dallas Cowboys, Minnesota Vikings, and New York Giants, but ultimately re-signed with the Redskins.  In 1990, Bowles received a salary of $300,000, and started 18 games (including playoffs).

The San Francisco 49ers signed Bowles to start for the team in 1991 after he was left unprotected by the Redskins again. He played in all 16 games and started in 14 of them.  He was waived during final roster cuts on September 1, 1992.  He was claimed off waivers by the Redskins on September 2, 1992.  He was waived by the Redskins during final roster cuts on August 31, 1993.

Coaching career
After retiring as a player, Bowles was a member of the Green Bay Packers' player personnel staff under Ron Wolf in 1995 and 1996. He was the defensive coordinator and secondary coach at Morehouse College in 1997, and the defensive coordinator and defensive backs coach at Grambling State from 1998 until 1999. He was the defensive backs coach for the New York Jets in 2000, Cleveland Browns in 2004, and Dallas Cowboys from 2005–2007. He was the Browns' defensive nickel package coach from 2001–2003.

Miami Dolphins
Bowles was hired by the Miami Dolphins as the team's secondary coach and assistant head coach on January 23, 2008. After nearly four seasons as the secondary coach and assistant head coach, he was named the interim head coach on December 12, 2011, following the firing of head coach Tony Sparano. Bowles' first game as interim head coach of the Dolphins came on December 18, on the road against the Buffalo Bills. The Dolphins won the game 30–23. The Dolphins finished 2–1 under Bowles in 2011.

Philadelphia Eagles
The Philadelphia Eagles hired Bowles as the team's secondary coach on January 30, 2012. The Eagles announced on October 16, 2012, that they dismissed defensive coordinator Juan Castillo from his duties and named Todd Bowles as their new defensive coordinator. Under Bowles, the Eagles finished the season ninth in pass defense and twenty-third in rushing defense also in long-time head coach Andy Reid's final season with the team.

Arizona Cardinals
On January 18, 2013, Bowles was hired as defensive coordinator for the Arizona Cardinals. On January 31, 2015, he was voted Associated Press (AP)'s Assistant Coach of the Year for his efforts in the 2014 season. Bowles received 22 of the 50 media members' votes, winning the inaugural award.

New York Jets
On January 14, 2015, the New York Jets named Bowles their new head coach and signed him to a four-year deal.

On July 28, 2015, it was revealed that Bowles underwent a partial knee replacement surgery. In the 2015 season, the Jets won 10 games in Bowles' first year leading the team, barely missing the playoffs. The 2016 season saw the Jets finish near the bottom of the league in most offensive categories, but 11th in rushing yards.

On December 29, 2017, the Jets announced that Bowles had been retained for the 2018 season, and signed an extension through 2020. However, on December 30, 2018, the Jets fired Bowles after finishing the season with a 4–12 record.

Tampa Bay Buccaneers
On January 8, 2019, Bowles was hired as the defensive coordinator of the Tampa Bay Buccaneers, rejoining Bruce Arians as a member of his staff after Arians was hired as the team's head coach.

Bowles' defense received praise for its performance in the 2020–21 playoffs as it was key in the Buccaneers defeating the New Orleans Saints in the divisional round and the Green Bay Packers in the NFC Championship game. Bowles won his third Super Bowl (his first as a coach) as the Buccaneers defeated the Kansas City Chiefs 31–9 in Super Bowl LV. Bowles was credited with a game plan that pressured Chiefs quarterback Patrick Mahomes without resorting to blitzing, by utilizing the two-deep safety look and pass-rushing which prevented the Chiefs' prolific offense from scoring a touchdown while also intercepting Mahomes twice.

On August 4, 2021, Bowles agreed to a three-year contract extension with the Buccaneers.

On March 30, 2022, Bowles was named the head coach of the Buccaneers after Bruce Arians shifted to a senior football consultant role. Bowles and the Buccaneers agreed to terms on a five-year deal.

Head coaching record

* – Interim head coach

References

External links
 Tampa Bay Buccaneers profile
 New York Jets profile 
 Arizona Cardinals profile

1963 births
Living people
African-American coaches of American football
African-American players of American football
American football safeties
Arizona Cardinals coaches
Cleveland Browns coaches
Dallas Cowboys coaches
Elizabeth High School (New Jersey) alumni
Grambling State Tigers football coaches
Green Bay Packers executives
Miami Dolphins coaches
Miami Dolphins head coaches
Morehouse Maroon Tigers football coaches
National Football League defensive coordinators
New York Jets coaches
New York Jets head coaches
Philadelphia Eagles coaches
Players of American football from New Jersey
San Francisco 49ers players
Sportspeople from Elizabeth, New Jersey
Tampa Bay Buccaneers coaches
Tampa Bay Buccaneers head coaches
Temple Owls football players
Washington Redskins players
Coaches of American football from New Jersey
20th-century African-American sportspeople
21st-century African-American sportspeople